Bartees Leon Cox Jr., (born January 30, 1989) known by his stage name Bartees Strange, is an English-born American musician. Cox was born in Ipswich, England, raised in Mustang, Oklahoma, and is now based in Washington D.C.

Early life
Cox was born in Ipswich, England, to a military father and opera-singer mother. The family moved from England to Germany, Greenland and various US states before settling in Mustang, Oklahoma,  when he was aged 12.
Before becoming a musician, Cox worked as the director of communications for a nonprofit environmental organization in Washington D.C.

Career
While living in Brooklyn, Cox was a member of post-hardcore band Stay Inside from 2016 to 2018. In late 2017, Cox released his first solo effort, the acoustic folk EP "Magic Boy" under the name Bartees & The Strange Fruit.

In March 2020, Cox released an EP of re-imagined covers of songs by The National, titled Say Goodbye to Pretty Boy, on Brassland. After being named an "Artist To Watch" by Stereogum, he released his debut solo LP, Live Forever, on October 2, 2020. Featuring a mix of hip hop, indie rock, and jazz music, the album was met with positive reception. Later that year, Cox participated in the 2020 Thursday Signals V2 live show, and continued to tour throughout 2021 and 2022, supporting artists such as Lucy Dacus, Phoebe Bridgers, Courtney Barnett, and Car Seat Headrest.

In 2022, Cox released his second album, Farm to Table. Following the album's release, he toured alongside artists such as The National, Japanese Breakfast, and Metric.

Personal life 
Cox identifies as bisexual.

Discography

Studio albums
Live Forever (2020) – Memory Music
Farm to Table (2022) – 4AD

Extended plays
Magic Boy (2017) (as Bartees & The Strange Fruit) 
Say Goodbye to Pretty Boy (2020) – Brassland
Tisched Off (2022) – Sub Pop

Singles
As lead artist

As featured artist

Guest appearances

Remixes

Tours
Headlining
2021 Tour (2021)

Supporting
Phoebe Bridgers – Reunion Tour (2021)
Lucy Dacus – 2021 Tour (2021)
Courtney Barnett – North American Tour (2021)
Car Seat Headrest – North American Tour (2022)
The National – 2022 Tour (2022)
Metric – The Doomscroller Tour (2022)

References

External links

20th-century LGBT people
21st-century American male singers
21st-century LGBT people
4AD artists
American rock singers
American hip hop singers
American jazz singers
Bisexual men
Bisexual singers
Bisexual songwriters
American LGBT singers
American LGBT songwriters
Living people
1989 births
Musicians from Ipswich
Musicians from Oklahoma
People from Mustang, Oklahoma